The Actions of St Eloi Craters from 27 March to 16 April 1916, were local operations in the Ypres Salient of Flanders, during the First World War by the German 4th Army and the British Second Army. The 27th Division captured all but  The 46th Reserve Division counter-attacked but the British captured  on 30 March. The Canadian Corps took over, despite the disadvantage of relieving troops in action.

The Canadians inherited positions in a deplorable state, the British having pressed their advantage, rather than consolidating the captured ground. On the night of  a German methodical attack recovered the captured craters. Canadian runners struggled to deliver messages and for several days the Canadian and British staffs were ignorant of which craters had been captured, the topography having been changed so much by the mine detonations. There were  the new ones superimposed on the old, the ground full of shell-holes and derelict trenches. Snipers made it impossible to orientate and fresh troops easily mistook one pair of craters for another.

The Canadians counter-attacked several times, then concentrated on consolidating the front line, ready for another attempt. Constant rain, oozing mud and incessant artillery-fire exhausted troops quickly and battalions had to be relieved after a couple of days. Canadian and British staffs were still ignorant of the German capture of  Conflicting reports added to the uncertainty but a reconnaissance by a Canadian major on 10 April found that the Germans were in crater 4. Plans to attack were cancelled and for two weeks both sides exchanged artillery-fire.

The mud and poor weather caused unprecedented misery on the troops but the first attack showed that with preparation, surprise and good timing a limited objective could be captured. The British had attacked with tired troops and had not achieved all of their objectives and the second attempt was at the cost of quick consolidation. At St Eloi, against an attack on a narrow front, where the defender had good observation, the ground could not be held. It was an open question as to what width of front to attack, narrow enough to guarantee success, yet wide enough to force the Germans to disperse their artillery-fire so that captured ground could be held.

Background

Ypres district

Ypres lies at the junction of the Ypres–Comines Canal and the Ieperlee. The city is overlooked by Kemmel Hill in the south-west and from the east by low hills running south-west to north-east, with Wytschaete (Wijtschate), Hill 60 to the east of Verbrandenmolen, Hooge, Polygon Wood and Passchendaele (Passendale). The rises are slight apart from the vicinity of Zonnebeke, which has a gradient of 

From Hooge and to the east, the slope is  near Hollebeke, it is  heights are subtle but have the character of a saucer lip around Ypres. Further south is the muddy valley of the Douve river, Ploegsteert Wood (Plugstreet to the British) and Hill 63. West of Messines Ridge is the parallel Wulverghem (Spanbroekmolen) Spur; the Oosttaverne Spur, also parallel, is to the east. The general aspect south of Ypres is of low ridges and dips, gradually flattening to the north into a featureless plain.

In 1914, Ypres had  and  inside medieval earth ramparts faced with brick and a ditch on the east and south sides. Possession of the higher ground to the south and east of the city, gives ample scope for ground observation, enfilade fire and converging artillery-fire. An occupier also has the advantage of artillery deployments and the movement of reinforcements and supplies being screened from view. The ridge had woods from Wytschaete to Zonnebeke, giving good cover, some being of notable size, like Polygon Wood and those later named Battle Wood, Shrewsbury Forest and Sanctuary Wood.

Roads in this area were usually unpaved, except for the main ones from Ypres, with occasional villages and houses. The lowland west of the ridge was a mixture of meadow and fields, with high hedgerows dotted with trees, cut by streams and ditches emptying into the canals.

1915

January 1915 was a month of rain, snow and floods, made worse for both sides by artillery-fire, sniping and the need for constant trench repairs. The British front was extended when the 27th Division and the 28th Division arrived in France and took over from the French XVI Corps. The British formed specialist tunnelling companies from soldiers who had been miners and tunnellers in civilian life, which began to reach France at the end of February. German troops attacked the 28th Division near St Eloi on 4 February and held the captured ground for several days. Further south, the 27th Division was attacked on 14 and 15 February; on 28 February, the 27th Division made a successful local attack along with Canadian troops.

British tunnelling companies

There was no British army mining organisation in 1914, except for a short course for Royal Engineers but after the First Battle of Ypres in 1914, siege warfare and mining began and the British realised that the Field and Siege Companies RE were in too great a demand to provide men for mining. On 3 December, Lieutenant-General Henry Rawlinson asked for a specialist battalion of sappers and miners and on 28 December the War Office was requested to send 500 clay kickers, civilian specialists in tunnelling through clay. The British Expeditionary Force (BEF) was ordered to form Brigade Mining Sections with miners and tunnellers already in the army. In February 1915, it was decided to form eight tunnelling companies from civilians recruited in Britain and transfers from the army. Another twelve companies were formed later in 1915, one in 1916, a Canadian Tunnelling Company was formed in December 1915, two more arrived in France in March 1916 and a New Zealand and three Australian tunnelling companies arrived in May. Counter-mining by the Tunnelling Companies RE began at St Eloi in the spring of 1915. Much of the mining in this sector was done by the 177th Tunnelling Company and the 172nd Tunnelling Company.

The Ypres area has a shallow soil layer of loam or sand above waterlogged semi-liquid sand and slurry patches of sand and clay. Beneath the second layer is a thick seam of blue clay. The early mining took place above the blue clay which put very heavy pressures of water and wet sand on the underground works. In August the digging of galleries had begun to be complete by the end of June 1916. Both sides spent 1915 mining and counter-mining, the British springing  and  against  mines and  In September, Brigadier-General George Fowke the Engineer in Chief, proposed a mining offensive in the blue clay  underground. Since the Germans were on the higher ground, galleries could be driven horizontally into the blue clay from shafts about  back from the front line. By January 1916, the 172nd Tunnelling Company had sunk shafts into the blue clay and began to dig galleries  under the German front position. After the Second Army offensive in the summer of 1916 was postponed, the mining offensive was made even more ambitious with a plan to mine Messines Ridge.

Action of St Eloi
The 80th Brigade of the 27th Division had fought hand-to-hand with the attackers but could not counter-attack, because of a lack of close reserves and German artillery barrages isolating the attack front. Just after midnight, two battalions managed to counter-attack and retook the village and the lost trenches. The Mound was not regained as the Germans had managed to consolidate and retained the advantage of observation from it.

Prelude

British offensive preparations

The salient was on a slight spur that ran down from the higher ground around Ypres, which gave a commanding view over the British lines. An attack on the Mound required mines to be sunk much deeper and work by the 172nd Tunnelling Company had begun in August 1915. Work on the deep mines continued for a possible operation in February 1916; eventually it was decided to dig six galleries from the deep shafts. After another German mine explosion at the Bluff in January, work on the shallow mines was stopped and all efforts were made to finish the deep galleries at St Eloi.

German miners could be heard above the deep galleries, which showed that the galleries had been advanced under the German lines but the British deep mines,  appeared to be safe from discovery. Work was stopped on  the furthest west, which was thought to be most vulnerable to exposure and on 10 March 1916, the Germans blew a camouflet which collapsed  of the gallery. Work still went on in the higher galleries and the British tunnellers entered two German galleries and demolished them. (For most of the time, the British preparations were obstructed by an efficient German counter-mining effort but the British carried away excavated earth in sacks by hand, dumped it in dips unseen and then camouflaged the dumps.) From Kemmel Hill, a hollow south of St Eloi could be observed and was thought to be a German assembly area. No artillery-fire was directed on the area but a code word was arranged at which the guns were to open rapid fire.

German defensive preparations

The 46th Reserve Division ( von Wasielewski), part of the XXIII Reserve Corps (General Hugo von Kathen) which had been in the Ypres area since late 1914, took over from the 123rd Division on 23 March, with both brigades in the line, the 92nd Brigade and the attached Reserve  Battalion 18 (RJB 18) taking over at St Eloi. The German mines in the area had become waterlogged and dilapidated but the 123rd Division engineers had been confident that a British mine attack was unlikely and air reconnaissance had revealed no obvious preparations for an attack. More artillery positions had been detected near Kruisstraat and Dickebusch Lake and huts had been built near Wulverghem and Vierstraat but this had not been seen as suspicious. During the night of 25/26 March, the III Battalion, Reserve Infantry Regiment 216 (RIR 216) was relieved by RJB 18, with I Battalion, RIR 216 in close reserve. On the afternoon of 26 March a listening post overheard British troops discussing mines to be fired at St Eloi but a careful inspection by German tunnellers found no cause for alarm. As a precaution, RJB 18 thinned its front line to keep more troops in the support trenches and it was a quiet night.

Battle

27–29 March

27th Division

The British heavy artillery fired a barrage along the flanking trenches and behind the salient, varying the area periodically. Infantry advanced quickly, ignoring the half-minute delay for flying débris and found that  had gone off under the German front and support lines, demolishing the defences.  had exploded in no man's land on the right flank, forming a crater to defend it.  had done the same on the left flank and also blown up a German grenade throwing post. The Northumberland Fusiliers advanced and lost only one man before reaching the German wire, finding that the German survivors were ready to surrender.

The Royal Fusiliers were hit by machine-gun fire from the left flank as they climbed the parapet; a German counter-barrage on the front line began only  after the Northumberland Fusiliers attacked and continued nearly all day. Consolidation was slowed by the German artillery-fire; working and carrying parties of the 1st Royal Scots Fusiliers and the 12th West Yorkshires from the 9th Brigade had many casualties. The Germans' deep drainage system had gone up with the mines, the trenches began to flood as intermittent showers turned into a downpour. The British troops were replaced frequently; despite their tiredness, battalions were poached from resting brigades to make up the numbers. Over the night of  the 13th King's, 2nd Royal Scots and the 8th East Yorkshire from the 8th Brigade relieved the 1st Northumberland Fusiliers, 4th Royal Fusiliers and the 1st Royal Scots Fusiliers. On the night of  the exhaustion of the troops led to the 2nd Suffolk and 10th Royal Welsh Fusiliers relieving two more 8th Brigade battalions and a company of the 18th Canadian Battalion from the 4th Canadian Brigade relieved the 12th West Yorkshires, the last of the 9th Brigade battalions. (In the morning an apparent German counter-attack turned out to be a surrender attempt.)

46th Reserve Division

Early in the morning of 27 March, German troops near St Eloi heard noises underground and then British mines exploded. After dark, counter-attacks from both flanks were repulsed; Kathen suspended the attacks and ordered forward every spare man from the 46th Reserve Division and parties from the 45th Reserve Division and 123rd Division, to dig another front position, which was done under British artillery-fire. On 30 March, patrols from II Battalion, RIR 216 scouted  but counter-attacks on 31 March by II Battalion and III Battalion against the British trenches covering  failed. The intense British artillery-fire was taken to be the preliminary of another attack and an extra battalion was sent to reinforce the 46th Reserve Division but  were lost. The advance of reserves to reinforce the defenders was stopped by British artillery fire and the confusion caused by the mine explosions.

30 March – 3 April

A force from the 1st Gordon Highlanders, 12th West Yorkshire and the 3rd Division Grenade School staff was picked to capture the parts of the objective not taken during the attack on 27 March. The Germans were found to be occupying  which they had fortified with a belt of barbed wire and machine-guns. Troops from II Battalion, RIR 216 had taken over  that day and it had been connected to the main German defences by a communication trench. The British attack was called off and an attempt made to cut off the German party in the crater which failed but  was found to be empty and was occupied and a machine-gun placed on each flank. The Germans attacked  on 31 March but were repulsed despite the sketchy defences of the crater. Haldane inspected part of the front, finding it waist deep in water and gave orders for another attack against  and the remaining objectives on 3 April. Haldane made another inspection to make sure of the line held and found that the crater in the place where the Mound had been was a good observatory but was protected only by a thin line of defences and it would be a race to improve them before the Germans could counter-attack.

4–5 April

Before 27 March, Plumer intended that the Canadians should take over the sector as soon as the attack was complete but the Canadian Corps commander, Lieutenant-General Edwin Alderson preferred to carry out the attack or wait until the front had settled before taking over. The tiredness of the 3rd Division meant that the Canadians were sent to take over while the front was still unsettled and the 2nd Canadian Division (Major-General Richard Turner) had to relieve the 3rd Division on the night of  before the captured ground had been consolidated and the German defences opposite had not been identified. Fifty men per company of the 6th Canadian Brigade wore the new Brodie helmet and took over from the 76th Brigade by  the British battalions being so depleted that only companies were needed to take over but the relief cost twelve hours of consolidation. The 3rd Division infantry went into reserve and the artillery stayed on until the night of 12 April, then lent its trench mortars and the  teams to the 2nd Canadian Division artillery. At noon on 4 April, the Canadian Corps took over from V Corps with the three Canadian divisions, the 1st Canadian Division having taken relieved the 50th (Northumbrian) Division on 3 April and the 3rd Canadian Division the 24th Division, the Canadian Corps holding the line from St Eloi, across the Ypres–Comines Canal to the II Corps north of Hooge.

The mines, artillery bombardments and inclement weather had demolished parapets, cut the wire and even well built trenches had collapsed. The shallow ditches and captured trenches facing the wrong way had no drainage and few dugouts, all waterlogged and incapable of resisting shell-splinters. There were no communication trenches and the four largest craters had to be by-passed, supply parties being tied together to pull out those who got stranded in flooded shell-holes. Wounded and dead lay everywhere and the relief parties could only find posts, some connected by shallow trenches. The Canadian commander recommended digging a temporary defence line along the west lips of the craters rather than the longer line in front, on a forward facing slope, easily watched from the ridges above, when a counter-attack was expected from the direction of the Bluff. The 6th Canadian Brigade, 2nd Canadian Pioneer Battalion and large working parties from the 4th and 5th Canadian brigades began to sandbag the defences and repair the drainage but the water was thick mud and oozed back when it was thrown out. German guns bombarded the area every  from the front and flanks, which made it impossible to consolidate the craters for  but the support and old front line, were much improved. Lack of rest and inability to carry food forward, led to a decision to swap the 27th Canadian Battalion with the 29th Canadian Battalion on the night of

Night 5/6 April

German preparations for a set-piece attack by the I Battalion, RIR 216 and I Battalion, RIR 214, took until 6 April. At  on 5 April, an intense German bombardment began (less gas shell, because of unfavourable wind) and continued until  The bombardment resumed at  just after the Canadian work details had withdrawn. The bombardment with artillery and trench mortars lasted for thirty minutes and destroyed much of the work of consolidation, the wire being swept away and two of four Lewis guns being knocked out. The British artillery barraged the German communication trenches and avenues of advance but the German infantry managed to get through.

The British artillery began to barrage lines of approach and communication trenches but German infantry found ways through and broke into the centre of the Canadian position, where the defenders had been killed by the bombardment. The Germans began to roll up the remaining defences and captured craters 2, 3 and 4, where there were 28th Canadian Battalion parties of  there to divert German artillery-fire. The parties were overwhelmed but at crater 5 the Canadians were able to hold out for a while and the attack on crater 6 and the line beyond was repulsed by the 31st Canadian Battalion. A rocket was sent up from crater 3 (the site of the Mound) and the German artillery began a barrage around the craters and across British communication trenches, which prevented reinforcements from moving up.

The Germans began to dig in, not needing to take cover, having the protection of the barrage. The British were ignorant of the situation at the front and prevented the British artillery from firing at the crater area, the barrage behind them continuing. In the centre, where  of trench had been lost, were two companies in communication trenches and the remaining positions before Voormezeele. Bombers of the 28th and 31st Canadian battalions in  thought they were in  The ground was a sea of  the new craters superimposed on the old ones, full of shell-holes and part-demolished trenches; if people raised their heads in daylight, they were sniped, which made it impossible to orientate.  were the biggest but the newer troops in the area easily mistook one pair of craters for another. All the ground lost on 27 March was recaptured by  British counter-attacks were defeated by dug in machine-guns.

6–19 April

Bombers of the 18th and 29th Canadian battalions, with two companies of the 28th Canadian Battalion, counter-attacked but failed to recapture  and during the night of  the 27th and the 29th Canadian battalions were relieved by the 21st Canadian Battalion. Turner said that they could either evacuate the area to make it untenable by artillery-fire or counter-attack on a wider front and consolidate the captured ground. An attack on a broader front would reduce the density of German counter-bombardment that the Germans could achieve. Since the area was thoroughly disturbed, surprise was impossible and with the offensive on the Somme looming, there was no time for a proper set-piece attack. Under the impression that only  had been lost, Plumer ordered the 2nd Canadian Division to hold its positions and recapture the craters. On the night of  the 6th Canadian Brigade was relieved by the 4th Canadian Brigade, which brought the 19th and 18th Canadian battalions forward. Bombers of the 18th, 19th and 21st Canadian battalions attacked  on the nights of  but were repulsed, as were German attacks on 

On the next couple of nights the 21st Canadian Battalion was relieved by the 20th and the 18th Canadian Battalion by the 25th in the centre and the commander of the 5th Canadian Brigade took over. More reliefs took place with the 22nd and 26th Canadian battalions replacing the 20th and 19th Canadian battalions. On 12 April, Plumer and Turner decided to concentrate on improving the front line; the frequent battalion reliefs were necessary due to fatigue and lack of sleep under constant bombardment, with no cover amidst mud and waterlogged shell holes. The Germans made occasional bomb attacks, intermittently bombarded the British lines during the day and fired Shrapnel shell bombardments at night, to catch working parties. During the night of  the 24th Canadian Battalion relieved the 25th and an officer crawled round the craters, reporting that the four along the old German front line were occupied. On 16 April, the weather improved enough for air reconnaissance by the RFC and photographs showed that the Germans had dug a trench to the west of the craters. Plans for more attacks were cancelled and on the night of  the 5th Canadian Brigade was relieved by the 6th Canadian Brigade. On 19 April, the Germans took  but patrols found that they were left unoccupied and an attack on crater 1 was defeated.

A new artillery scheme had been devised by the II Wing Royal Flying Corps (RFC) and the Second Army in February 1916. When the message General Artillery Action was received, RFC squadrons were to stop routine operations and commence artillery co-operation and reconnaissance of corps and army areas, until the signal Situation Normal was received. Despite the winter weather, 6 Squadron managed to conduct counter-battery sorties until 6 April and for the rest of the fighting at the craters, the RFC squadrons mostly flew artillery-observation sorties.

Aftermath

Analysis

The mud and poor weather had imposed unprecedented misery on the infantry and after 19 April, a lull began and both sides were content to let the area quieten. With sufficient preparation, a measure of surprise and discretion over timing, a limited objective could be captured on the Western front. The British had attacked with a tired and depleted division and had not achieved all of the objectives, making a second attempt necessary, at the cost of foregoing a quick, thorough consolidation. Against an attack on a narrow front where the defender had good observation over the area, the ground could not be held and at St Eloi, the German defenders had a full view of the British positions. It was an open question as to the width of front to attack, narrow enough to guarantee success, yet wide enough to force the Germans to disperse their artillery-fire so that captured ground could be held. The fighting at St Eloi was one of nine sudden attacks for local gains made by the Germans or the British between the appointment of Sir Douglas Haig as commander in chief of the BEF and the beginning of the  Battle of the Somme. After the Second Battle of Ypres (22 April – 25 May 1915) and the Battle of Loos (25 September – 13 October). 

The BEF was at a tactical disadvantage against the German army, on lower, boggy ground, easily observed from German positions. When the BEF took over more of the Western Front from the French, it was to be held lightly with outposts, while a better line was surveyed further back. The survey revealed that the French gains of 1915 would have to be abandoned, a proposal that the French rejected out of hand. For political reasons, giving up ground around Ypres in Belgium was also unacceptable and to reach better positions, only an advance could be contemplated. Since the French and British anticipated early advances in 1916, there seemed little point in improving defences, at a time when the Germans were building more elaborate fortifications, except at Verdun. Rather than continue the informal truces that had developed between French and German trench garrisons, the British kept an active front and five of the German local attacks in the period were retaliation for three British set-piece attacks.

In early 1916, the Germans had an advantage in trench warfare equipment, being equipped with more and better hand grenades, rifle grenades and trench mortars. It was easier for the Germans to transfer troops, artillery and ammunition along the Western Front than the Franco-British, who had incompatible weapons and ammunition and a substantial cadre of German pre-war trained officers, NCOs and soldiers remained. The British wartime volunteers gained experience in minor tactics but success usually came from machine-guns and the accuracy and quantity of artillery support, not individual skill and bravery; in the air the RFC overcame the Fokker Scourge and underground, the BEF tunnellers overtook the Germans in technology and ambition. When the Bluff was captured, the British retook it; Mount Sorrel and Tor Top were retaken by the Canadians and British successes at St Eloi and Vimy Ridge were short-lived. Constant local fighting was costly but it enabled the mass of inexperienced British troops to gain experience, yet had the front been less densely occupied, more troops could have had more training; the wisdom of each policy was debated at the time and since.

Casualties

On 27 March, the 9th Brigade lost   and  taking  from RJB 18. In the 2nd Canadian Division to 16 April, there were   them from the 6th Canadian Brigade.

Subsequent operations

An elaborate trench network was dug around the St Eloi craters by the Germans, with a front line west of the craters and a reserve line to the east; the 46th Reserve Division held the new line until it was moved south to the Somme in August. In March 1916, 172nd Tunnelling Company handed its work at St Eloi over to the 1st Canadian Tunnelling Company and mining operations at St Eloi continued. The largest mine at St Eloi was begun by the Canadian tunnellers on 16 August 1915, with a deep shaft named Queen Victoria,  dug near Bus House Cemetery behind a farm-house called Bus House by the British troops.

For the Battle of Messines in 1917, the British began a mining offensive against the German lines along the ridge to the south of Ypres. Twenty-six deep mines were dug by Tunnelling companies RE, most of which were detonated simultaneously on 7 June 1917, creating  craters. The joint explosion of the mines in the Battle of Messines was one of the largest ever non-nuclear explosions.  When the large St Eloi deep mine was fired by the 1st Canadian Tunnelling Company on 7 June 1917, it destroyed craters D2 and D1 from 1916 but the double crater H4 and H1 can still be seen. The detonation was followed up by the 41st Division, which captured the German lines at St Eloi.

Memorials
On a small square in the centre of Saint-Eloi stands the 'Monument to the St Eloi Tunnellers' which was unveiled on 11 November 2001. The brick plinth bears transparent plaques with details of the mining activities by the 172nd Tunnelling Company and an extract from the poem Trenches: St Eloi by the war poet Thomas Hulme (1883–1917). There is a flagpole with the British flag next to it and in 2003, a field gun was added to the memorial. The participation of the Canadian Corps in the Actions at St Eloi are commemorated on the nearby Hill 62 (Sanctuary Wood) Memorial.

See also
 Battle of Messines (1917)
 Mines in the Battle of Messines (1917)
 List of Canadian battles during the First World War
 St. Eloi Mountain, Canada
 Noel Mellish, chaplain who won the VC

Notes

Footnotes

References

Further reading

Books

External links

 The Actions of St Eloi Craters

History of Ypres
Tunnel warfare in World War I
1916 in Belgium
Explosions in 1916
St Eloi Craters
St Eloi Craters
St Eloi Craters
St Eloi Craters
March 1916 events
April 1916 events